Casuarinin is an ellagitannin. It is found in the pericarp of pomegranates (Punica granatum). It is also found in Casuarina and Stachyurus species and in Alnus sieboldiana.

It is an isomer of casuarictin. It is a highly active carbonic anhydrase inhibitor.

Biosynthesis 
In some plants including oak and chestnut, the ellagitannins are formed from 1,2,3,4,6-pentagalloyl-glucose and further elaborated via oxidative dehydrogenation (tellimagrandin II and casuarictin formations). After conversion of casuarictin to pedunculagin, the pyranose ring of the glucose opens and the family of compounds including casuariin, casuarinin, castalagin, and castlin, vescalagin and vescalin forms.

References 

Ellagitannins
Pomegranate ellagitannins
Carbonic anhydrase inhibitors